Bluefield is a city in Mercer County, West Virginia, United States. The population was 9,658 at the 2020 census. It is the principal city of the Bluefield WV-VA micropolitan area, which had a population of 106,363 in 2020.

Geography
Bluefield is located at  (37.262219, -81.218674) in the Appalachian Mountains of West Virginia across the state border from Bluefield, Virginia.

Demographics

2010 census
As of the census of 2010, there were 10,447 people, 4,643 households, and 2,772 families living in the town. The racial makeup of the town was 73.7% White, 23.0% African American, 0.3% Native American, 0.5% Asian, 0.2% from other races, and 2.3% from two or more races. Hispanic or Latino of any race were 0.9% of the population.

There were 4,643 households, of which 26.1% had children under the age of 18 living with them, 38.6% were married couples living together, 16.5% had a female householder with no husband present, 4.6% had a male householder with no wife present, and 40.3% were non-families. 35.0% of all households were made up of individuals, and 15.1% had someone living alone who was 65 years of age or older. The average household size was 2.21 and the average family size was 2.83.

The median age in the city was 43.1 years. 20.8% of residents were under the age of 18; 9.2% were between the ages of 18 and 24; 22.2% were from 25 to 44; 28.6% were from 45 to 64; and 19.2% were 65 years of age or older. The gender makeup of the city was 46.8% male and 53.2% female.

2000 census
As of the census of 2000, there were 11,451 people, 5,038 households, and 3,078 families living in the city. The population density was 1,311.3 people per square mile (506.4/km). There were 5,966 housing units at an average density of 683.2 per square mile (263.9/km). The racial makeup of the city was 75.84% White, 22.14% African American, 0.12% Native American, 0.56% Asian, 0.01% Pacific Islander, 0.21% from other races, and 1.13% from two or more races. Hispanic or Latino of any race were 0.52% of the population.

There were 5,038 households, out of which 24.7% had children under the age of 18 living with them, 43.5% were married couples living together, 13.9% had a female householder with no husband present, and 38.9% were non-families. 34.9% of all households were made up of individuals, and 17.5% had someone living alone who was 55 years of age or older. The average household size was 2.23 and the average family size was 2.87.

The age distribution was 21.9% under the age of 18, 9.0% from 18 to 24, 23.5% from 25 to 44, 24.5% from 45 to 64, and 21.5% who were 65 years of age or older. The median age was 42 years. For every 100 females, there were 84.4 males.

History
The European-American history of Bluefield began in the 18th century, when two families settled in a rugged and remote part of what is now southern West Virginia. Others joined them and they built a small village with a mill, a church, a one-room schoolhouse, and a fort for defending the settlement against invasions by the Shawnee Indian tribe, which had a village on the banks of the Bluestone River.

In 1882, the descendants of the Davidson and Bailey family sold a portion of their land, when Captain John Fields of the Norfolk and Western Railway pioneered the area and began building a new railroad through the hills of Bluefield. The city is traditionally thought to be named after the chicory flowers in the area, which give the fields a purplish blue hue during the summer. Research has shown that this settlement, also known as Higginbotham's Summit in the 1880s, was probably named for the coal fields that were developed in the area of the Bluestone River.

Coal rush
Beneath the land of the Davidsons and Baileys lay the largest and richest deposit of bituminous coal in the world. The first seam was discovered in nearby Pocahontas, Virginia in the backyard of Jordan Nelson. President Frederick Kimball of the Norfolk and Western Railway described this as the "most spectacular find on the continent and indeed perhaps of the entire planet." The coal seam had been mentioned much earlier in Thomas Jefferson's Notes on the State of Virginia, but it was not mined until 1882.

Around that time, coal mines were developed in the area around Harman, Bluefield, War, and Pocahontas, which together were known as the Pocahontas Coal Fields. They helped support the Industrial Revolution in the United States. The development of the coal industry in this area created a boom in the local and national economy and attracted immigrant European workers and enslaved/ migrant African Americans from the Deep South to the mountains in search of industrial work. During the Great War and World War II, coal from this area supplied the navies of the United States and United Kingdom.

In the late 19th century, the Norfolk and Western Railway Company selected Bluefield as the site for a repair center and a major division point, which greatly stimulated the town's growth. (The N&W headquarters were located in Roanoke, VA)  In the one-year period from 1887 to 1888, passenger travel along the railroad increased 317%. As with the extremely accelerated growth of San Francisco during the gold rush, Bluefield became a city that seemed to spring up "overnight." Growth far outpaced the existing infrastructure. Urban sprawl and blight were common complaints in the early days, as workers crowded into aging housing.

The growth and decay of the city depended almost entirely upon Norfolk and Western Railroad. When coal tonnage was good and the market for coal was booming, Bluefield was essentially a "Little New York," as it was called in the day. A bustling metropolis, it had a nightlife and a personality that was "a little bit Chicago, a little bit New York, and a whole lot of Pittsburgh"—rugged and with steel and coal embedded in its soul.

The coal boom generated a flood of money in the area. Nearby Bramwell, incorporated in 1888, boasted that it was the "Millionaires' Town" because more millionaires per capita lived there than anywhere in the nation. The city also had more automobiles per capita than any other city in the country.

In 1889, the city of Bluefield was officially incorporated.

With a strong Black community, Bluefield was the site of the 1895 founding of the Bluefield Colored Institute, an historically black college. It developed as today's Bluefield State University. It is known as "The Whitest Historically Black College in America".

20th century
During the 1920s, the twelve-story West Virginian Hotel was built. It has been adapted and in the 21st century is operated as the West Virginia Manor and Retirement Home. In 1924, nearby Graham, Virginia decided to rename itself as Bluefield to try to unite the two towns, which had been feuding since the civil war. Nobel Prize-winning economist and mathematician John Forbes Nash was born in Bluefield in 1928. George Marshall Palmer, the well-renowned Purdue University Professor of aeronautics and director of the AerospaceSciences Laboratory at Purdue, lead of the invention of the Boeing wind tunnel and a pioneer in the aerodynamic and structural testing of skyscrapers was born in Bluefield in 1921.

The Great Depression was particularly damaging to Bluefield. With the government nearly bankrupt, after a series of devastating structural fires swept through the downtown area, the city was nearly destroyed. It was not until the outbreak of World War II that coal production revived.

The strategic importance of the city was so great that Adolf Hitler put Bluefield on his reputed list of German air raid targets in the United States. Air raid practice drills were common in the city during this time.

The Interstate Highway System was constructed through East River Mountain on December 20, 1974; for the first time automobile traffic could reach the city without crossing the top of the mountain. The dependence on the railroads waned and restructuring changed the industry. Bluefield lost jobs and population as a result. Its Amtrak station closed in the 1980s. Mercer Mall, the area's major shopping mall, opened in 1980.

Educational institutions
 Bluefield High School
 Bluefield State University
 Valley View Seventh-day Adventist School

Climate

Bluefield is a mountain city with a warm-summer humid continental climate (Dfb) bordering on subtropical highland climate or temperate oceanic climate (Cfb), due to its elevation. It is characterized by moderately cold, snowy winters and pleasantly warm to hot summers.

Culture
Bluefield prides itself on its hospitable climate. Since 1938 the Chamber of Commerce has given free lemonade when the temperature has surpassed 90 °F. The city's motto is "nature's air conditioned city, where the summer spends the winter."

Jazz musician Louis Jordan's song "Salt Pork, W.Va." was inspired by his time in a Bluefield jail.

The song "Sweet Georgia Brown" was co-written by Maceo Pinkard, a native of Bluefield.

A controversy exists over whether or not Hank Williams was last seen alive in Bluefield on his way to a show in Ohio. He was discovered dead in Oak Hill, West Virginia.

Lex Luger won the NWA United States Heavyweight Championship in Bluefield in a televised match on May 22, 1989, defeating Michael Hayes.

Bluefield is mentioned in the Stylistics' 1973 song Rockin' Roll Baby as the birthplace of Little Joe.

Bluefield was the hometown of fictional character Rita Stapleton Bauer on the CBS soap Guiding Light.

Ron Shelton, director and screenwriter of the 1988 film Bull Durham, played for the Bluefield Orioles in 1967. Furthermore, Bluefield is mentioned in the film.

Infrastructure

Transportation

Rail
The last passenger train was the Catlettsburg, Kentucky to Washington and Boston Hilltopper train of Amtrak, which was terminated in sweeping cuts in 1979. Until 1977 Amtrak's Mountaineer operated from Chicago and Cincinnati, through Bluefield, and then through lower Virginia to Norfolk, Virginia. Into the 1960s the Norfolk and Western Railroad operated trains from the Mid-West to the metropolitan Norfolk-Newport News, Virginia area, and Bluefield City was a stop. The station was located at 715 Princeton Avenue.

Transportation
U.S. routes 19, 460, 21 and 52 run through the city. Interstate 77 is a short distance to the east. Proposed and under construction are interstates 73 and 74, labeled as King Coal Highway.

Air
General Aviation service is provided at Mercer County Airport, located off State Highway 123 between Bluefield and Princeton.  The last commercial service by Colgan Air ended in 2007. This therefore makes Raleigh County Memorial Airport the nearest airport with commercial service.

Sports
Bluefield was the home of the Appalachian League (rookie) Bluefield Orioles baseball team until 2010.  The Orioles have had a team in Bluefield since 1958, which was the longest relationship between a parent club and a town in affiliated baseball. The Toronto Blue Jays replaced Baltimore for the 2011 season with the Bluefield Blue Jays. The team played  at Bowen Field (former Orioles stadium) through 2020. In conjunction with a contraction of Minor League Baseball beginning with the 2021 season, the Appalachian League was reorganized as a collegiate summer baseball league, and the Blue Jays were replaced by a new franchise in the revamped league designed for rising college freshman and sophomores.

Bluefield High School has 522 state championships in all sports, which is more than any other AA school in the state. Bluefield ranks second (tied with now-closed Ceredo-Kenova) in total football state championships with 11, behind national powerhouse Parkersburg High School (16). Bluefield won the High School State AAA Football Championship in 1959, 1962, 1965, 1967, 1975 and 1984. They won the West Virginia State AA football title in 1997, 2004, 2007, 2009 and 2017. Bluefield High School won the West Virginia AA State Championship in boys basketball in 1995, 1996, 2013 and 2014.

Bluefield is largely a football town and carries on a rivalry between the Bluefield Beavers and their sister city Bluefield, Virginia. The annual Beaver-Graham game is played at Mitchell Stadium, the home field of both schools.

Bluefield is also home to the East River Soccer Complex which has five fields and hosts local high school and college soccer games. The Southern West Virginia King's Warriors of the USL PDL play their home games at the East River Soccer Complex.

Bluefield is also the home of the Rough and Rowdy Brawl, an amateur boxing tournament owned by Barstool Sports and broadcast on pay per view via its website. The tournament features many local and non-local fighters who compete in 3 one minute rounds.

Notable people 
 John Forbes Nash, Jr., Nobel Prize-winning mathematician. Basis for Sylvia Nasar's biography, A Beautiful Mind
 John S. Knight, newspaper publisher
 Blitzkid, The horror punk band, began in Bluefield, WV in the winter of 1997.
 Brian Platnick, contract bridge champion 
 Anna Stuart, soap opera actress
 Toni Stone, first of three women to play professional baseball full-time
 Christy Martin, professional boxer, International Boxing Hall of Fame member

Notes

References

External links

 
 City website

 
Cities in Mercer County, West Virginia
Twin cities
Cities in West Virginia